Robert Lee Collins (June 1, 1930 - October 21, 2011) was an American director and screenwriter. He is the creator of the American police procedural television series Police Woman, which starred Angie Dickinson.

Collins also was about to direct Star Trek: Phase II, but was changed due to the basis of the motion picture and was replaced by director, Robert Wise. His other credits includes, Police Story, Marcus Welby, M.D., The Bold Ones: The New Doctors, Cannon and The Name of the Game. In 1975, Collins was nominated for an Primetime Emmy for Outstanding Writing in a Drama Series. He died in October 2011 of cardiopulmonary arrest in Van Nuys, California, at the age of 81.

References

External links 

1930 births
2011 deaths
American male screenwriters
American film directors
American television directors
American television writers
American male television writers
American screenwriters
American directors
People from Los Angeles